Parlick Fell is a cheese made from sheep milk in Longridge, Lancashire, England. It is a white cheese with a semi-soft, crumbly texture and a tangy, nutty flavour.

The cheese is made by Singletons & Co. It is named after Parlick, one of the hills at the southern end of the Bowland Fells, on which sheep owned by Simon Stott are grazed.

References

Sheep's-milk cheeses
English cheeses
Lancashire cuisine